Coca tea, also called mate de coca, is an herbal tea (infusion) made using the raw or dried leaves of the coca plant, which is native to South America. It is made either by submerging the coca leaf or dipping a tea bag in hot water. The tea is most commonly consumed in the Andes mountain range, particularly Argentina, Bolivia, Colombia, Ecuador and especially in Peru, where it is consumed all around the country. It is greenish yellow in color and has a mild bitter flavor similar to green tea with a more organic sweetness.

Though also known as mate, mate de coca has very little in common with the yerba mate drink in Southeastern South America.

Alkaloid content and stimulant properties

The leaves of the coca plant contain alkaloids that—when extracted chemically—are the source for cocaine base. The amount of coca alkaloid in the raw leaves is small, however.  A cup of coca tea prepared from one gram of coca leaves (the typical contents of a tea bag) contains approximately 4.2 mg of organic coca alkaloid.  (In comparison, a typical dose (a "line") of cocaine contains between 20 and 30 milligrams.)  Owing to the presence of these alkaloids, coca tea is a mild stimulant; its consumption may be compared to consumption of a moderately strong cup of coffee or tea.  The coca alkaloid content of coca tea is such that the consumption of one cup of coca tea can cause a positive result on a drug test for cocaine, however.

Similar to decaffeination in coffee, coca tea can be decocainized. Just as decaffeinated coffee retains a small quantity of caffeine, decocainized coca tea will still contain a small quantity of organic coca alkaloids.

Legal status
Coca tea is legal in Colombia, Peru, Bolivia, Argentina, and Ecuador. Its use is being discouraged in part by the Single Convention on Narcotic Drugs. Coca tea is illegal in the United States unless it is decocainized.

Traditional medicine
Andean indigenous peoples use the tea in traditional medicine practices.

Coca tea may be recommended for travelers in the Andes to prevent altitude sickness, although its actual effectiveness has never been systematically studied.

See also

 Vin Mariani, a French-Corsican coca wine
 Pemberton's French Wine Coca, a coca wine, the inspiration for Coca-Cola
 Coca-Cola, an international soft drink made with decocainized coca leaf
 Coca Colla, a similar Bolivian drink
 Cocoroco, a very strong Bolivian alcoholic beverage
 Coca flour

References

Preparations of coca
Herbal and fungal stimulants
Latin American cuisine
Herbal tea
Indigenous cuisine of the Americas
Peruvian drinks